The Companhia de Defesa Química, Biológica e Nuclear (former 1º Pelotão de Defesa Química, Biológica e Nuclear (1º PDQBN)) is a Special force of the Brazilian Army responsible for chemical, biological and nuclear defense. The company assists and advises the preparation and employment of troops and resources in environmental NBC (nuclear, biological and chemical). Their mission is survey, identify, detect and monitor pollution levels and, where appropriate, decontaminate personnel, equipment and areas under the influence of NBC agents.

Chemical warfare
Brazilian Army